Monica Milne was the first woman diplomat in the UK in 1946.

In 1946 the complete ban on women entering the Foreign Office was lifted, though a maximum quota of 10% was set of entrants into the administrative branch, and those employed were obliged to resign when they got married. Monica Milne was taken in in the Administrative (A) Branch in 1946.

Before this, she had served with the Ministry of Economic Warfare in the US, and her performance had been so impressive that on her appointment to the Foreign Office in 1946 she was immediately posted back to Washington. She resigned after less than ten years of service because of the marriage rule.

References

Year of birth missing
Year of death missing
British women diplomats